Richard Hugh Tilly (October 17, 1932 – February 18, 2023) was an American economic historian.

Born to a family of German descent in Chicago, Richard Tilly studied history at the University of Wisconsin, Madison. From 1955 to 1957, he completed his military service largely in Germany, where he learned the language of his grandfather and, in 1960, married his wife Elisabeth, of Würzburg. After working for an insurance company, Tilly continued his studies, earning his Ph.D. in economics in 1964 from the University of Wisconsin, Madison, after two years of intensive research in Germany. After holding positions in Ann Arbor and Yale, he was appointed director of the newly founded Institute for Economic and Social History of the University of Münster in 1966, which he directed until his retirement in 1997.

Richard H. Tilly was an important advocate of the New Economic History developed in the late 1950s, which pursues economic history using economic theories and quantitative methods. Despite considerable resistance, Tilly paved the way for cliometrics in Germany. His research shaped an academic school — his students have occupied no fewer than seven professorships in Germany.

Tilly's research focuses primarily on the themes of growth, financial institutions, and businesses; in addition, he made important contributions to various historical fields, including social and regional history, as well as the history of business cycles. Of his eight books, his classics Financial Institutions and Industrialization in the Rhineland, 1815-1870 (1966) and Kapital, Staat und sozialer Protest in der deutschen Industrialisierung (1980) deserve special mention. His concise historical overview of Germany's economic and social development Vom Zollverein zum Industriestaat: Die wirtschaftlich-soziale Entwicklung Deutschlands 1834 bis 1934 (1990) achieved great importance as a teaching text.

Tilly died on February 18, 2023, at the age of 90.

Bibliography 

 Financial Institutions and industrialization in the Rhineland 1815-1870. Madison: University of Wisconsin Press, 1966
 Charles Tilly / Louise Tilly / Richard H. Tilly: The Rebellious Century: 1830-1930, Harvard: Harvard University Press, 1975, 9780674749559
 Richard Tilly / Paul J. J. Welfens (Hrsg.): Economic Globalization, International Organizations and Crisis Management: Contemporary and Historical Perspectives on Growth, Impact and Evolution of Major Organizations in an Interdependent World,

Links 
 Pressemitteilung der Universität Münster
 Toni Pierenkemper: Richard H. Tilly (1997) (PDF; 1,6 MB) 
 Verleihung des Helmut-Schmidt-Preises 2009 an Richard Hugh Tilly

References 

1932 births
2023 deaths
Writers from Chicago
21st-century American historians
21st-century American male writers
American male non-fiction writers
American people of German descent
University of Michigan faculty
Yale University faculty
Academic staff of the University of Münster
German Historical Institute, Washington, DC